Gerson Victalino (19 September 1959 – 29 April 2020), also commonly known simply as Gerson, was a Brazilian professional basketball player.

National team career
With the senior Brazilian national basketball team, Victalino won a silver medal at the 1983 Pan American Games and a gold medal at the 1987 Pan American Games. He competed at the Summer Olympics in 1984, 1988, and 1992.

Victalino was also a member of the Brazilian teams which respectively finished in fourth place at the 1986 FIBA World Championship and fifth place at the 1990 FIBA World Championship.

References

External links 
  (profile 1)
  (profile 2)

1959 births
2020 deaths
Basketball players at the 1983 Pan American Games
Basketball players at the 1984 Summer Olympics
Basketball players at the 1987 Pan American Games
Basketball players at the 1988 Summer Olympics
Basketball players at the 1992 Summer Olympics
Bàsquet Manresa players
Brazilian men's basketball players
Centers (basketball)
Clube Atlético Monte Líbano basketball players
Esporte Clube Sírio basketball players
Olympic basketball players of Brazil
Power forwards (basketball)
Pan American Games gold medalists for Brazil
Pan American Games medalists in basketball
Pan American Games silver medalists for Brazil
Small forwards
Sport Club Corinthians Paulista basketball players
Sportspeople from Belo Horizonte
1986 FIBA World Championship players
1990 FIBA World Championship players
Medalists at the 1983 Pan American Games
Medalists at the 1987 Pan American Games
20th-century Brazilian people